Dave Angel (born David Angelico Nicholas Gooden; 13 May 1966) is an English techno musician. Angel was born in Chelsea, London, England. He is the son of a London-based jazz musician, and the elder brother of rapper Monie Love.  He had an unorthodox musical education; his father influenced him deeply, as did his friends and his environment, including the radio. He listened not only to Miles Davis and Charlie Parker, but also to soul music and funk. Even though he was playing instruments at 14 years old, including percussion, his musical development was not easy or straightforward.

Career
His musical career started when he borrowed an old electronic keyboard from a friend and, using a double tape deck, assembled a bassline and drum track, over which he laid "Sweet Dreams (Are Made of This)" by Eurythmics. He called the result his Nightmare mix, and borrowed money from a friend to press 500 copies.  When BMG, and thus the Eurythmics, learnt of this, Annie Lennox wanted to prevent the sale of what was in effect an unlicensed version of their song; however, her partner Dave Stewart liked the mix, and persuaded her to allow Angel to go ahead. The track, involving elements of jazz, Detroit techno and breakbeat hardcore, was successful, reaching number 23 on the UK Singles Chart.

Not long afterwards, Angel received many invitations, and gained much respect from European artists, becoming part of the Phaze One team together with the drum & bass DJs Fabio and Grooverider (who used to play styles from house to hardcore at that time). The doors were also opened for his career as a producer. Despite the quality of his productions, however, such as the EPs "The Family" by Apollo and "Royal Techno" by Rotation Records, he was unable to make much impression in England. Through his label, Rotation Records, he gave opportunities to many of the current producers, including many of other nationalities, such as Paul Hazel, Cisco Ferreira, Vince Watson, Samuel L. Session, Steve Rachmad, and Sharpside.

He released tracks for labels such as Black Market, Love, Rotation, and specially the Belgian R&S Records. 1995 saw the release through Studio !K7 of his CD "X-Mix-4 – Beyond The Heavens", which included songs from all over the world such as Chez Damier's "Help Myself", F2's "Dominica" and his remix for Sun Electric's "Entrance."  The second half of the 1990s brought Angel closer to funk than jazz when he released tracks from the LP Globetrotting, such as "Tokyo Stealth Fighter", "This is Disco", and "Funk Music".  Over the years that followed, he gained a central position on the international scene, making appearances at the biggest events and festivals; he plays all over the world, and has become an important figure in international techno. Angel is the father of UK rapper Fabien Darcy.

Discography

Albums
Tales of the Unexpected (1995), Blunted
Globetrotting (1997), 4th & Broadway
Frame by Frame Remixes (2011), Plaza in Crowd

Compilations
Classics (1996), R&S Records
16 Flavours of Tech Funk (1998), React 	
DA02: The Reworks Album (2002), Trust the DJ

Singles and EPs
Eurythmics / Angel* – Angel / Sweet Dreams (Nightmare Mix) (12", Promo)	RCA 1990	
 	
1st Voyage ◄ (3 versions) R&S Records 1991	
 	
Rolling Thunder ◄ (4 versions) Outer Rhythm 1991	
 	
Stairway To Heaven ◄ (2 versions) R&S Records 1992	
 	
Never Leave ◄ (2 versions) Love Records 1992	
 	
Outrages Angel EP (12", EP) Outrage Recordings 1992	
 	
The Family EP ◄ (2 versions) Apollo 1993	
 	
Royal Techno EP ◄ (2 versions) Rotation Records 1993	
 	
New Orchestrations EP ◄ (2 versions) Fnac Music Dance Division 1993	
 	
3rd Voyage (12") R&S Records 1993	
 	
Original Man (12") Aura Surround Sounds 1993	
 	
In Flight Entertainment ◄ (3 versions) Blunted, Island Records	1994	
 	
Seas of Tranquility EP (12", EP) Rotation Records 1994	
 	
Handle With Care EP ◄ (6 versions) Blunted 1995	
 	
Stalker / Timeless (7", Ltd) Jockey Slut 1995	
 	
Timeless ◄ (3 versions)	4th & Broadway, Island Records	1996	
 	
Funk Music ◄ (6 versions) Island Records 1997	
 	
Tokyo Stealth Fighter ◄ (7 versions) 4th & Broadway 1997	
 	
This Is Disco ◄ (4 versions) 4th & Broadway 1997	
 	
Excursions E.P. (12", EP) Jericho 1998	
 	
Insights EP (12", EP) Rotation Records 1998	
 	
Knockout EP ◄ (2 versions) Rotation Records 1999
	
Dave Angel / Jamie Anderson – The Knockout EP / The Rematch (12", EP) Rotation Records 2000	
 	
Dave Angel / Jel Ford – Myths EP ◄ (2 versions)	Rotation Records 2002	
 	
Ocean Dwellers ◄ (2 versions) Rotation Records 2003	
 	
Warriors E.P. (12", EP)	Rotation Records 2005	
 	
Rotation (DJ Marky & XRS Remix) / Brothers (XRS Remix) ◄ (2 versions) V Recordings 2006	
 	
Taurus / Gemini (12") Niah 2007	
 	
Sheba / Mothership – Part 1 (12") Niah 2007	
 	
Medusa (12") Jericho 2008	
 	
Ghost Train E.P. ◄ (2 versions)	Plaza in Crowd 2009	
 	
Dogspray (12") Jericho 2009	
 	
Front And Back (12") Jericho 2010	
 	
K Road Nz (12", S/Sided, W/Lbl, Ltd) Unknown

DJ mixes
Trance Lunar Paradise ◄ (3 versions) Sound Dimension Recordings 1994	
 	
X-Mix-4 – Beyond The Heavens ◄ (4 versions) Studio !K7 1995	
 	
Darren Emerson & Dave Angel – Mixmag Live! Volume 13 – Techno ◄ (2 versions) DMC Publishing 1996	
 	
Dr Alex Paterson* / Mixmaster Morris / Mr C* / Sven Vath* / Darren Emerson / Dave Angel – The History of Mixmag Live – 3 (Volumes 009/011/013) (3xCD, Comp, Mixed + Box, Comp)	DMC Publishing 1997	
 	
London Electronica – In The Mix With Dave Angel (CD, Comp, Mixed) Kickin Records 1997	
 	
39 Flavours of Tech Funk (2xCD, Mixed, Comp) React 1998	
 	
DA01 (CD, Comp, Mixed) Trust The DJ 2001	
 	
DA03 ◄ (2 versions) Trust The DJ 2003

References

External links
 

English techno musicians
English record producers
Living people
1966 births
People from Chelsea, London
Musicians from London
Rhythm King artists